Ng Ching-fai, GBS (born 20 November 1939 in Shanghai, China) is a Professor of Chemistry and the former President and Vice-Chancellor of Hong Kong Baptist University and the President of United International College.

Before he became the President and Vice-Chancellor of HKBU, Ng was the Dean of the Faculty of Science of the University and a member of the Hong Kong Legislative Council from July 1997 to July 2001.

Ng also serves as a Member of the National People's Congress of the People's Republic of China. Ng was awarded the Gold Bauhinia Star (GBS) order by the Hong Kong Government on 1 July 2005.

He attended the University of Melbourne and earned a PhD degree at the University of British Columbia.

References

1939 births
Living people
Academic staff of Hong Kong Baptist University
Delegates to the 9th National People's Congress from Hong Kong
Delegates to the 10th National People's Congress from Hong Kong
Delegates to the 11th National People's Congress from Hong Kong
Hong Kong scientists
Educators from Shanghai
Heads of universities in Hong Kong
People's Republic of China politicians from Shanghai
Scientists from Shanghai
Members of the Provisional Legislative Council
New Century Forum politicians
HK LegCo Members 1998–2000
HK LegCo Members 2000–2004
Members of the Preparatory Committee for the Hong Kong Special Administrative Region
Members of the Selection Committee of Hong Kong
Hong Kong Affairs Advisors
University of Melbourne alumni
University of British Columbia alumni